was the twenty-sixth of the sixty-nine stations of the Nakasendō. It is located in the present-day town of Tateshina, in the Kitasaku District of Nagano Prefecture, Japan.

History
It was located near the eastern entrance to the Kasadori Pass and was well known for its silk production.

Neighboring post towns
Nakasendō
Mochizuki-shuku - Ashida-shuku - Nagakubo-shuku
(Motai-shuku was an ai no shuku located between Mochizuki-shuku and Ashida-shuku.)

References

Stations of the Nakasendō
Stations of the Nakasendo in Nagano Prefecture